Ampezzo is a comune (municipality) in the Province of Udine in the Italian region Friuli-Venezia Giulia, located about  northwest of Trieste and about  northwest of Udine.

The municipality of Ampezzo contains the frazioni (subdivisions, mainly villages and hamlets) Cima Corso, Oltris, and Voltois.

Ampezzo borders the following municipalities: Forni di Sotto, Ovaro, Sauris, Socchieve.

Demographic evolution

References

External links
 www.comune.ampezzo.ud.it/
 Oltris

Cities and towns in Friuli-Venezia Giulia
Articles which contain graphical timelines
Ladinia